Sylhet Science and Technology College (SSTC) is an intermediate college in the city of Sylhet, Bangladesh. It is situated on Mirer Maidan, near the holy Shah Jalal's Dargah Sharif. Founded in 1872, it is the first dedicated science college in the city. It participated in the Higher Secondary Examination (HSC) for the first time in 2016. The Muhibur Rahman Foundation runs the college and Muhibur Rahman is the chairman of the governing body.

References

Colleges in Sylhet District
2014 establishments in Bangladesh
Educational institutions established in 2014